Tony Dixon (born June 18, 1979) is a former American football safety in the National Football League for the Dallas Cowboys. He was selected by the Dallas Cowboys in the second round of the 2001 NFL Draft. He played college football at the University of Alabama.

Early years
Dixon attended Pickens County High School, where he was a two-way football player (running back and defensive back). He was a four-year starter and earned All-State honors two years in a row. 

As a junior he registered 1,286 rushing yards, 17 touchdowns, 115 tackles and 6 interceptions (3 returned for touchdowns). As a senior, he posted 1,450 rushing yards, 18 rushing touchdowns, 2 touchdown passes, one receiving touchdown, 6 sacks, 4 interceptions and 2 fumble recoveries.

College career
Dixon accepted a football scholarship from the University of Alabama. As a true freshman, he collected 22 tackles (2 for loss) and one sack, earning his first career start at free safety against the University of Tennessee. He had 6 tackles against Auburn University.

As a sophomore, he became a regular starter at strong safety, tallying 75 tackles (third on the team), 2 tackles for loss, one interception and one pass defensed. He had 11 tackles against Louisiana State University. He made 14 tackles against Mississippi State University.

As a junior, he split time between strong and free safety. He posted 65 tackles (second on the team), 2 tackles for loss, 4 passes defensed and one forced fumble. He had 13 tackles against the University of Florida.

As a senior, he started at free safety, finishing with 90 tackles (third on the team), one sack, 2 interceptions, 6 passes defensed and one forced fumble. He had 10 tackles, one interception and one pass defensed against the University of Mississippi. He made 17 tackles against the University of Tennessee. He made 11 tackles against Auburn University.

Professional career

Dallas Cowboys (first stint)
The Dallas Cowboys traded down in the second round of the 2001 NFL Draft, sending to the Miami Dolphins the 52nd overall selection (Chris Chambers), in exchange for the 56th (used to select Dixon) and the 122nd (Markus Steele). As a rookie, he played on the nickel defense.

In his second season, he started the last six games at strong safety, after Darren Woodson suffered a season-ending groin injury, making 49 tackles, 2 sacks, 4 quarterback pressures, 2 passes defensed, one interception and 16 special teams (third on the team). 

In 2003, he was a special teams standout, leading the team with 20 tackles.

In 2004, after Woodson missed the season due to a herniated disc, he split time with Lynn Scott at strong safety, registering seven starts and finding a niche as a blitzer, tying for fifth in the NFL among defensive backs with 3 sacks. He wasn't re-signed after the season and finished his Cowboys career with 90 tackles (56 solo), 6 sacks, 10 passes defensed, 49 special teams tackles and one interception.

Washington Redskins
On June 18, 2005, signed a one-year contract as a free agent with the Washington Redskins. He was released before the start of the season on August 23.

Dallas Cowboys (second stint)
On November 1, 2005, he was signed by the Dallas Cowboys to help improve the secondary depth. On November 9, he was cut to make room for linebacker Quinton Caver. He was brought back for depth purposes on December 26. He wasn't re-signed at the end of the season.

References

1979 births
Living people
People from Reform, Alabama
Players of American football from Alabama
American football safeties
Alabama Crimson Tide football players
Dallas Cowboys players